Simon Francis Baker (born 6 February 1958 in Melbourne, Victoria) is a retired male race walker from Australia, who represented his native country in four consecutive Olympic Games: 1984, 1988, 1992 and 1996.

Achievements

External links
 

1958 births
Living people
Australian male racewalkers
Athletes (track and field) at the 1984 Summer Olympics
Athletes (track and field) at the 1986 Commonwealth Games
Athletes (track and field) at the 1988 Summer Olympics
Athletes (track and field) at the 1990 Commonwealth Games
Athletes (track and field) at the 1992 Summer Olympics
Athletes (track and field) at the 1994 Commonwealth Games
Athletes (track and field) at the 1996 Summer Olympics
Olympic athletes of Australia
Athletes from Melbourne
Commonwealth Games gold medallists for Australia
Australian Institute of Sport track and field athletes
Commonwealth Games medallists in athletics
World Athletics Race Walking Team Championships winners
Medallists at the 1986 Commonwealth Games